Trichodes laminatus is a beetle species of checkered beetles belonging to the family Cleridae, subfamily Clerinae. It can be found in Italy, Sicily, Spain, and North Africa.

References

ammios
Beetles of Europe
Beetles described in 1787